GZI Transport Limited is a transport company engaged in the management of toll roads of expressways and national highways in Guangdong, China.

Its parent company is Guangzhou Investment Company. It is headquartered in Hong Kong and listed on the Hong Kong Stock Exchange as red chip stock in 1997.

References

External links
GZI Transport Limited

1997 establishments in China
Companies listed on the Hong Kong Stock Exchange
Government-owned companies of China
Transport in Guangdong
Companies based in Guangzhou
Transport companies established in 1997